The Seven Magnificent Gladiators is an Italian peplum film directed by Bruno Mattei.

Production 
The box office success of Conan the Barbarian sparked a mini-revival of peplum film productions between 1982 and 1990 in Italy. The Seven Magnificent Gladiators was part of the revival. Among the production crew was cinematographer Silvano Ippoliti who had shot many of the original peplum films and Brad Harris and Dan Vadis who had starred in peplum films of the previous era.

A filmed version of Hercules was originally announced in Variety to be directed by Bruno Mattei from a screenplay by Ricardo Ghione. Principal photography was scheduled to begin May 1982 in Rome, Italy while The Hollywood Reporter named Claudio Fragasso as screenwriter, and Ennio Morricone as music composer and conductor. Neither Mattei, Fragasso, or Morricone appear in onscreen credits. The Hollywood Reporter later stated that principal photography began on August 1982 in Italy under the direction of Luigi Cozzi. Hercules was filmed back-to-back with The Seven Magnificent Gladiators in Italy in 1982. The Seven Magnificent Gladiators was filmed first. During production, Brad Harris suggested to actor Lou Ferrigno that he should star in a new Hercules film, which also was shot in 1983. After production commenced, it was followed by the shooting of Hercules, which began on 12 July 1982.

The film was produced by Cannon Italia SrL and filmed a De Paolis Studios in Rome, some of the outdoor scenes were filmed in Ostia Antica. The film's plot is a re-working of Seven Samurai.

Cast 
 Lou Ferrigno as Han
 Sybil Danning as Julia
 Brad Harris as Scipio
 Dan Vadis as Nicerote
 Carla Ferrigno as Pandora
 Barbara Pesante as Anakora
 Yehuda Efroni as Emperor
 Mandy Rice-Davies	as Lucilla
 Robert Mura as Vendrix
 Emilio Messina as	Goliath 
 Giovanni Cianfriglia as Festo 
 Sal Borgese as Glafiro 
 Françoise Perrot as Cornelia 
 Antonella Giacomini as Diana 
 Mary Rader as	Lydia
 Giuseppe Mattei as Dex 
 Gregg Logan as Dario
 Peter Rugge as Meorio
 Raul Cabrera as Army Captain 
 John Growne II as	Judas
 Laddy Price as Leper 1
 George Wender	as Boy 1
 Henry Tyre as Boy 2
 Eve London as Girl 1

Release 
The Seven Magnificent Gladiators was released in Italy in 1983 and in August 1983 in the United States.

Reception 
Kim Newman (Monthly Film Bulletin) described the film as a ″such an exact remake/rip-off of The Seven Samurai/The Magnificent Seven that the only possible surprise comes from the casting of Sybil Danning in the Brad Dexter role.″ Newman stated that Bruno Mattei ″seems totally at a loss when confronted with an action scene, and tends unfortunately to emphasize″ the stately pace and clumsy horsemanship of the participants in a noticeably unexciting chariot race, and the gauche weediness of the village girls and dotards required to fight Nicerote's hordes in the scrappy final battle.″

See also 
 List of Italian films of 1983

References

Sources

External links 
 

Films directed by Bruno Mattei
Italian historical drama films
Remakes of Italian films
Films set in ancient Rome
Films set in the Roman Empire
1980s Italian films